The Emirates Amateur Radio Society (in Arabic, جمعية الإمارات لهواة اللاسلكي) is a national non-profit organization for amateur radio enthusiasts in the United Arab Emirates.  EARS is formally recognized as a national organization by the Ministry of Social Affairs in the United Arab Emirates.  The EARS represents the interests of UAE amateur radio operators before UAE and international telecommunications regulatory authorities.  EARS is the national member society representing the United Arab Emirates in the International Amateur Radio Union, approved on February 10, 2009.

See also 
Amateur Radio Association of Bahrain
Kuwait Amateur Radio Society
Qatar Amateur Radio Society

References 

United Arab Emirates
Clubs and societies in the United Arab Emirates
Radio in the United Arab Emirates
Organisations based in Sharjah (city)